Acheta domesticus, commonly called the house cricket, is a cricket most likely native to Southwestern Asia, but between 1950 and 2000 it became the standard feeder insect for the pet and research industries and spread worldwide. They can be kept as pets themselves, as this has been the case in China and Japan.

Description 
The ovipositor is brown-black, and is surrounded by two appendages. On males, the cerci are also more prominent and house crickets are also omnivores.

Diet 
The house cricket is an omnivore that eats a range of plant and animal matter. Crickets in the wild consume flowers, seeds, leaves, fruits, grasses and other insects (including dead members of their own species). Crickets in captivity will accept fruits (e.g. apples, oranges, bananas), vegetables (e.g. potatoes, carrots, squash, leafy vegetables), grains (e.g. oatmeal, cornmeal, cooked corncobs, alfalfa, wheat germ, rice cereal), various pet foods and commercial cricket food.

Life cycle 
They have no special overwintering stage, but can survive cold weather in and around buildings, and in dumps where heat from fermentation may sustain them. Eggs are deposited in whatever damp substrate is available. Juveniles resemble the adults except for being smaller and wingless.

Diseases
The house cricket was essentially eliminated from the cricket-breeding industries of North America and Europe by the appearance of cricket paralysis virus which spread rapidly in Europe in 2002 and then in the United States in 2010.  The virus is extremely lethal to this species of cricket and a few others, and left many hobbyists and researchers without adequate feeder insects.  It has been replaced by the Jamaican field cricket, which is resistant to cricket paralysis virus and has many of the desirable features of the house cricket.

As food 
 
The house cricket is an edible insect. It is farmed in South-East Asia and parts of Europe and North America for human consumption. In Asia, it is said to become more popular than many native cricket species due to what consumers claimed was their superior taste and texture. Dry-roasting is common and is considered the most nutritious method of preparing them, though they are often sold deep-fried as well. Farmed house crickets are mostly freeze-dried and often processed into a powder known as cricket flour. In Europe, the house cricket is officially approved for use in food products in Switzerland (since 2017) and in the European Union member states (since 2022). In the EU, the house cricket was approved as novel food in frozen, dried and powdered forms with the Commission Implementing Regulation (EU) 2022/188 of 10 February 2022. Before that, the European Food Safety Authority had published a safety assessment on August 17, 2021, stating that frozen and dried formulations from whole house crickets are safe for consumption.

Nutritional value 
House crickets are an incomplete protein source, deficient in tryptophan and lysine. They contain both omega-3 and omega-6 fatty acids.

References

External links 

 Sound recordings of Achetus domesticus at BioAcoustica

Gryllinae
Orthoptera of Europe
Insects described in 1758
Taxa named by Carl Linnaeus
Edible insects
Insects as feed
Pet foods